Dividend on Death is a 1939 detective novel by the American writer Brett Halliday. It was the first novel in Halliday's Michael Shayne series of novels, portraying the investigations of a private detective. It also introduced the character of Phyllis Brighton, who became Shayne's wife. It was followed in 1940 by a second novel The Private Practice of Michael Shayne. When a film version of Michael Shayne was made, it borrowed some elements from the first novel but was largely based on The Private Practice of Michael Shayne.

References

Bibliography
 Backer, Ron. Mystery Movie Series of 1940s Hollywood. McFarland, 2010.

1939 American novels
American novels adapted into films
Novels by Brett Halliday